Gorr is an alternative transliteration of Nór, the mythic founder of Norway.

Gorr may also refer to:

Gorr the God Butcher, a Marvel Comics character, enemy of Thor
Gorr the Golden Gorilla, a Marvel Comics character, enemy of the Fantastic Four
Libbi Gorr (born 1965), Australian TV and radio broadcaster
Rita Gorr (1926–2012), Belgian operatic mezzo-soprano

See also 
 Goar (disambiguation)
 Gor (disambiguation)
 Gore (disambiguation)